Nemesis Glacier is a large glacier which flows northeast through the center of the Aramis Range, Prince Charles Mountains. Discovered in January 1957 by ANARE (Australian National Antarctic Research Expeditions) southern party under W.G. Bewsher, and named after Homer's Nemesis because considerable difficulty was experienced in traversing the region due to the glacier.

See also 
 List of glaciers in the Antarctic
 Glaciology

Further reading 
 James P. Minard, Glaciology and Glacial Geology of Antarctica, P 19
 Johanna Laybourn-Parry, Jemma Wadham, Antarctic Lakes
 BERND WAGNER, NADJA HULTZSCH, MARTIN MELLES, and DAMIAN B. GORE, Indications of Holocene sea-level rise in Beaver Lake, East Antarctica, Antarctic Science 19 (1), 125–128 (2007) https://doi.org/10.1017/S095410200700017X
 Adamson, D.A, Mabin, Mark, Luly, Jon, Holocene isostasy and late Cenozoic development of landforms including Beaver and Radok Lake basins in the Amery Oasis, Prince Charles Mountains, Antartica, Antarctic Science 9(03):299 - 306, September 1997 https://doi.org/10.1017/S0954102097000382
 Ian C. W. Fitzsimons, The Metamorphic Histories of some Proterozoic Granulites from East Antarctica, January 1991
 Herzfeld U.C. (2004), Combination of SAR and Radar Altimeter Data: Lambert Glacier/Amery Ice Shelf, Atlas of Antarctica. Springer, Berlin, Heidelberg
 Hultzsch, N., Wagner, B., Diekmann, B., & White, D. (2008), Mineralogical implications for the Late Pleistocene glaciation in Amery Oasis, East Antarctica, from a lake sediment core., Antarctic Science, 20(2), 169–172. https://doi:10.1017/S0954102007000880

External links 

 Nemesis Glacier on USGS website
 Nemesis Glacier on AADC website
 Nemesis Glacier on SCAR website
 Nemesis Glacier long term updated weather forecast

References 
 

Glaciers of Mac. Robertson Land